Takashi Fujinuma (Japanese 藤沼貴) (1931 — January 9, 2012) was a Japanese translator of Russian and a Doctor of Philology.

Biography 
Takashi Fujinuma was born in Liaoning Province, China. He graduated from Tokyo Waseda University, Faculty of Philology. Fujinuma taught Russian literature until his retirement in 1997.

Fujinuma is known as a researcher and translator of the works of Leo Tolstoy (War and Peace, Anna Karenina, Resurrection). He was interested in all Russian classical and folk literature. Fujinuma created a biography of Tolstoy, which was published in several editions. For his research on Nikolay Karamzin, he was awarded the degree of Doctor of Philology.  Fujinuma was a co-author and editor of several Russian-Japanese dictionaries, textbooks, and other similar works. For a long time, he was an active participant in bilateral cultural relations and repeatedly visited Russia.

On January 9, 2012, Fujinuma died of pneumonia at the age of 80.

References 

1931 births
Japanese translators
2012 deaths
Japanese philologists
Deaths from pneumonia in Japan